David W. Ling (January 22, 1890 – May 17, 1965) was a United States district judge of the United States District Court for the District of Arizona.

Education and career

Born in Ann Arbor, Michigan, Ling received a Bachelor of Laws from the USC Gould School of Law in 1913. He was in private practice in Clifton, Arizona from 1913 to 1927, and was a county attorney of Greenlee County, Arizona from 1921 to 1927. He was a Judge of the Superior Court of Greenlee County from 1927 to 1936.

Federal judicial service

On May 28, 1936, Ling was nominated by President Franklin D. Roosevelt to a seat on the United States District Court for the District of Arizona vacated by Judge Fred Clinton Jacobs. Ling was confirmed by the United States Senate on May 30, 1936, and received his commission on June 3, 1936. He assumed senior status on October 11, 1964. Ling served in that capacity until his death on May 17, 1965, in Phoenix, Arizona.

References

Sources
 

1890 births
1965 deaths
Judges of the United States District Court for the District of Arizona
United States district court judges appointed by Franklin D. Roosevelt
20th-century American judges
People from Greenlee County, Arizona
USC Gould School of Law alumni
People from Ann Arbor, Michigan